"I Wonder If They Ever Think of Me" is a song written and recorded by American country music artist Merle Haggard and The Strangers.  It was released in December 1972 as the first single from the album I Love Dixie Blues.  The song was Haggard and The Strangers fourteenth number one on the U.S. country singles chart. It was number one for a single week and spent a total of thirteen weeks on the chart.

Chart performance

References

1972 singles
1972 songs
Merle Haggard songs
Songs written by Merle Haggard
Song recordings produced by Ken Nelson (American record producer)
Capitol Records singles